The 1998 Gujarat cyclone (Joint Typhoon Warning Center designation: 03A; India Meteorological Department designation: ARB 02) was a catastrophic tropical cyclone that killed at least 10,000 people in India, especially the state of Gujarat.

Meteorological history

On June 1, an area of low pressure developed over the Laccadive Islands. Two days later, the JTWC issued a TCFA for the system as it became better organized. Early on June 4, the JTWC issued its first advisory on Tropical Cyclone 03A. Around the same time, the IMD began monitoring the system as Depression ARB 02. Shortly after, the depression was upgraded to a deep depression and further strengthened into a cyclonic storm the following day. The small storm moved slowly towards the west and weakened as wind shear began to increase. The storm weakened below tropical storm intensity later that day and the initial final advisory was issued. However, the system redeveloped and advisories resumed the next day. The storm gradually intensified as it moved towards the northwest.

The IMD also marked the increase in intensity, upgrading ARB 02 to a severe cyclonic storm. Around this time, the storm began to turn towards the north and accelerate due to an approaching mid-level trough. As the storm neared the Indian coastline, an eye developed and the storm strengthened into the equivalent of a major hurricane with winds reaching . Then it made landfall near Porbandar in the Indian state of Gujarat between 01:00 and 02:00 UTC. The storm weakened following landfall and the JTWC issued their final advisory later that day. The IMD continued to monitor ARB 02 until June 10, by which time it had weakened to a depression before dissipating.

Impact and aftermath

Tropical Cyclone 03A brought a large storm surge of 4.9 m (16 ft) which devastated coastal communities and salt mines. An estimated 4,000 to 10,000 people were killed by the storm, many of whom were salt mine workers who did not own a radio and received little or no warning of the cyclone. The large loss of life was partially attributed to contractors who wanted to continue making profits and did not inform their workers of the approaching storm. According to the official figures, 1173 people died and 1774 people went missing. Also, the region had witnessed only 17 cyclones since 1890, all of which were weaker than 03A. As a result, its vulnerability was miscalculated by the local population and the disaster management administration. Power supply to numerous residences was lost due to the storms high winds. A microwave tower in Porbandar collapsed, causing widespread disruption in telecommunication. Hundreds of other power transmission towers also fell, causing an estimated loss of Rs 10 billion for the Gujarat Electricity Board. At least 893 people were injured by the storm and over 11,000 animals were killed. Over 162,000 structures were damaged or destroyed throughout the affected area and damages amounted to Rs. 120 billion (US$3 billion).

Over the next one month, insurance companies had lost approximately Rs. 13 billion (US$266.5 million). The remnants of the storm produced heavy rains over Pakistan which electrocuted 12 people. In the wake of the storm, the United States Government provided US$25,000 for rehabilitation of the affected population. The Government of Denmark also contributed $72,992 in funds for relief efforts. The Gujarat government deployed approximately 330 medical teams to the affected areas.

See also

 1998 North Indian Ocean cyclone season
 1999 Pakistan cyclone
Cyclone Nilofar
Cyclone Vayu
Cyclone Tauktae

References

External links
India Meteorological Department

Extremely severe cyclonic storms
Gujarat Cyclone, 1998
Tropical cyclones in Pakistan
History of Gujarat (1947–present)
Disasters in Gujarat